A number of steamships have been named Mendoza, including –
, An Argentine cargo liner wrecked in 1914.
, An Italian ocean liner in service 1905–14
, A French passenger ship and British troopship in service 1919–43
, A German cargo ship in service 1937–42

Ship names